Dödsfärd is the third studio album release by Viking metal band Månegarm. It was released in 2003. The word dödsfärd translates roughly as "journey of death" in Swedish.

Track listing

External links
 Månegarm's official website

 

Månegarm albums
2003 albums